Sobraon is a village in Punjab, India. It is located west to Harike village in Tarn Taran district. The Sutlej river is to the south of this village. The village is located at 31°10'39N 74°51'10E with an altitude of 192 metres (633 feet).

History
It is famous for being the site of the Battle of Sobraon.

References

Villages in Tarn Taran district
Historic sites in India